Stevens Derilien (born 16 February 1992) is a Turks and Caicos Islander footballer who plays as a midfielder for Full Psychic FC and the Turks and Caicos national football team.

Career

International
Derilien made his senior international debut on 30 May 2014 in a 1-0 defeat to Aruba during 2014 Caribbean Cup qualification. He scored his first international goal on 3 June 2014 in a 2-0 victory over the British Virgin Islands at the same tournament.

Career statistics

International

International goals
Scores and results list Turks and Caicos Island's goal tally first.

References

External links
Profile at ESPN FC

1992 births
Living people
Turks and Caicos Islands footballers
Turks and Caicos Islands international footballers
Association football midfielders